Mike Brown (born December 23, 1957) is an American former professional ice hockey player. He was selected by the New York Rangers in the 11th round (164th overall) of the 1977 NHL amateur draft.

Career statistics

External links

1957 births
Living people
American men's ice hockey defensemen
Eastern Hockey League players
Flint Generals players
Ice hockey people from Detroit
Kalamazoo Wings (1974–2000) players
New York Rangers draft picks
Saginaw Generals players
Western Michigan Broncos men's ice hockey players
Ice hockey people from Michigan